Neptunia is a genus of flowering plants in the family Fabaceae. It belongs to the mimosoid clade of the subfamily Caesalpinioideae.

Selected species
Neptunia amplexicaulis Domin
Neptunia dimorphantha Domin
Neptunia gracilis Benth.
Neptunia lutea
Neptunia major (Benth.) Windler 
Neptunia monosperma F.Muell. ex Benth.
Neptunia pubescens
Neptunia oleracea

References

 
Fabaceae genera